Croatia selected its entry for the 1995 Eurovision Song Contest through the "Dora 1995" contest, which was held on 12 March 1995, organised by the Croatian national broadcaster Hrvatska radiotelevizija (HRT) in Opatija. The winners were Magazin and Lidija with "Nostalgija".

Before Eurovision

Dora 1995 
HRT organised the Dora contest to select the Croatian entry to the Eurovision Song Contest 1995, held in Opatija. The national contest consisted of a televised final with 20 songs selected from a public call for submissions from songwriters and composers. The winner was chosen by 20 regional juries.

At Eurovision
Magazin & Lidija performed 11th on the night of the contest, following Turkey and preceding France. At the close of voting they had received 91 points, finishing 6th in a field of 23 competing countries. The Croatian jury awarded its 12 points to Malta.

Voting

References

External links
Dora 1995 at the Eurofest Croatia website 

1995
Countries in the Eurovision Song Contest 1995
Eurovision